Carol Ann Bagley Amon (born April 23, 1946) is a senior United States district judge of the United States District Court for the Eastern District of New York.

Education and early career

Amon was born in Richmond, Virginia. She received a Bachelor of Science from College of William and Mary in 1968, then a Juris Doctor from University of Virginia School of Law in 1971. She was a staff attorney of the Communications Satellite Corporation in Washington, D.C. from 1971 to 1973. She was then a trial attorney of Narcotics Task Force of the United States Department of Justice from 1973 to 1974.

Assistant United States Attorney

Amon was an Assistant United States Attorney of the Eastern District of New York from 1974 to 1986. She was chief of frauds from 1978 to 1980, and then chief of general crimes from 1981 to 1982. She was a senior litigation counsel from 1984 to 1986.

In 1983, Amon successfully prosecuted four members of the Irish Republican Army (IRA) who conspired to obtain guns, explosives and missiles for the IRA.

District Court service

She was a United States magistrate judge of the United States District Court for the Eastern District of New York from 1986 to 1990. She was nominated by President George H. W. Bush to be a United States District Judge of that court on May 18, 1990, to a seat vacated by Mark A. Costantino. She was confirmed by the United States Senate on August 3, 1990, and received her commission on August 7, 1990. She served as Chief Judge from 2011 to 2016. She took senior status on November 30, 2016.

In 2009, Amon sentenced disgraced NBA referee Tim Donaghy to 15 months in federal prison for his role in fixing NBA games.

References

Sources

1946 births
Living people
Assistant United States Attorneys
College of William & Mary alumni
Judges of the United States District Court for the Eastern District of New York
Lawyers from Richmond, Virginia
United States district court judges appointed by George H. W. Bush
20th-century American judges
University of Virginia School of Law alumni
United States magistrate judges
21st-century American judges
20th-century American women judges
21st-century American women judges